The 2022 World Polo Championship is the 12th edition of the polo tournament for national national teams. It will be held from October 26 to November 6 and will feature eight teams with up to 14 goals of handicap.

It was originally secheduled to be held in October 2021 at the Empire Polo Club in Indio, California. The event was postponed to 2022 due to the COVID-19 pandemic, and will be held at the Valiente Polo Farm and International Polo Club Palm Beach in Wellington, Florida.

The previous winner Argentina and host country the United States automatically qualify with the remaining six teams competing to qualify by the summer of 2021.

XII FEDERATION OF INTERNATIONAL POLO WORLD CHAMPIONSHIP 2022 
-The tournament is being held in Florida, United States from 29th October – 6th November, with the top teams – Argentina, Australia, Italy, Mexico, Pakistan, Spain, the United States and Uruguay, competing for the international polo glory. The initial group games will be played at VPF-Valiente Polo Farm and the opening ceremony, semifinals and final will be held at NPC – National Polo Center, Wellington, Florida.

XII FIP World Polo Championship, USA: Finals | Spain Are 2022 Polo World Champions; Sudden Death Win Against Hosts the United States.

Qualifying zones 

Zone A – North and Central America
Zone B – South America
Zone C – Europe
Zone D – Asia and Oceania
Zone E – Africa, Pakistan and India

External links

FIP

References

2022
Polo competitions in the United States
Sports competitions in Florida
Sports in Palm Beach County, Florida
Wellington, Florida
World Polo Championship